Urusei Yatsura 2: Beautiful Dreamer  is a 1984 Japanese anime fantasy comedy film written and directed by Mamoru Oshii. It is the second film in the Urusei Yatsura film series based on the manga of the same name by Rumiko Takahashi. Its predecessor, Only You, was also directed by Oshii. It was released in Japan on February 11, 1984 during the second season of the series.

While Only You was more faithful to Takahashi's original manga and anime series, Beautiful Dreamer was a significant departure, with Oshii placing an emphasis on deeper philosophical issues. Although the film initially received mixed responses upon its initial release, Beautiful Dreamer later received critical acclaim as an early example of Oshii’s well-received style of filmmaking. In 2009, Kinema Junpo ranked it as one of the best Japanese animated movies.

The film experimented with concepts such as a time loop, dreams, and simulated reality, and has drawn comparisons to later works including Ghost in the Shell (1995), Groundhog Day (1993), Dark City (1998) and Inception (2010).

Plot
Ataru and Lum are among the students at Tomobiki involved in preparing for the student fair. Some of them grow suspicious that their days have been repeating. To (secretly) validate the theory, they are all sent home, instead of sleeping overnight like they had been. All the students end up back at the school, unable to leave the city limits. They board a Harrier jump jet and fly upwards into space. They see that their entire city is on the back of a giant turtle, in the otherwise empty void of space. The students investigate the school, believing it to be the source of the strange happenings. Seemingly impossible events transpire, like a student chased by his own reflections in an infinity mirror.

Reality quickly shifts. While before, everything seemed normal, the city now has a  post-apocalyptic aesthetic. Only a handful of humans are present, working electricity is rare, and many buildings have worn into ruins. Members of the group trick a dream demon into revealing himself. He describes his plan to create an endless dream, free of another spirit who tends to devour his dreams when they become nightmares. The nightmare eater is summoned and the reality of the dreamscape collapses as he eats the dream. Ataru continues waking up in successive nightmares. Lum tells him that to wake up, he must speak the name of the person he wants to see. After naming several other women, he names Lum and wakes up in the school. Surrounded by his classmates, he and Lum briefly discuss the dream she had. Lum asks to kiss, but Ataru is embarrassed. Unknown to the others, the dream demon and dream eater are shown working on the school festival. The demon implies he will "keep up" with Lum and Ataru.

Cast

Production
Like its predecessor, Only You, Beautiful Dreamer borrows heavily from the Japanese fairy tale of Urashima Tarō. Whereas the previous film was written by Tomoko Konparu, Beautiful Dreamer was written by Oshii with no consultation from Rumiko Takahashi. Writer/director Mamoru Oshii, who was unsatisfied with how the first film had developed, rejected the idea of catering to audience expectations and decided to do the film his own way. This almost caused Takahashi to reject the script because it deviated so far from the original story. In an interview with Kinema Junpo in 2008, Oshii said that he felt joy making the film because, at that time, he finally "understood how to make a film". In the 2002 Japanese DVD commentary for Beautiful Dreamer, Oshii gave some more insight regarding his involvement with the film. According to the commentary, Oshii some of the film's design were inspired by M. C. Escher and that he wanted to create a story "from the viewpoint of a man" as opposed to Takahashi's "by the hands of women" work.

Release
Beautiful Dreamer was released theatrically in Japan on February 11, 1984, where it was distributed by Toho. 

Central Park Media released the film on VHS in North America on November 1, 1993, and on DVD on June 8, 2004. The DVD contained a "full-length" directors' commentary by Mamoru Oshii as well as an art gallery. Beautiful Dreamer is also the only Urusei Yatsura film released in the United States by US Manga Corps and not AnimEigo, though AnimEigo is credited with doing the translation and subtitling of the film on the VHS release, as well as designing the DVD packaging to match the other movies in the series. The movie aired on the Sci-Fi Channel's anime lineup in the U.S. in the late 1990s. In 2016, Discotek Media announced they had licensed the film in North America and will release it on DVD and Blu-ray. It was released on February 27, 2018.

In Japan, the DVD of the film was released in 2002, featuring both the original mono soundtrack as well as an all-new 5.1 surround audio track, both in Japanese, as well as audio commentaries by Mamoru Oshii, associate director Junji Nishimura, and Shigeru Chiba. A Japanese Blu-ray was planned for release in March 2009 before being cancelled. The Blu-ray was eventually released on January 21, 2015, ranking in third place on the weekly Oricon charts during its release week, with 7,860 copies sold. The Blu-ray lacks the audio commentaries featured in the original DVD release.

Reception

Critical response

Contemporary reviews
Upon its initial release, the film received mixed responses, generally from the fan community. Criticism was especially given towards Oshii, with several fans sending him letters containing razor blades. In Stray Dog of Anime: The Films of Mamoru Oshii, Brian Ruh noted that the film "angered a number of viewers" as it placed "emphasis more on deeper philosophical issues" instead of the more comedic tone of the series. In an interview with Richard Eisenbeis in 2017, Oshii recalled fan criticism on the film's deemphasis of its series characters, especially of Lum.

Later reception
In subsequent reviews of the film, critics considered Beautiful Dreamer to be an early example of Oshii's well-received style of filmmaking. Brian Ruh noted that the film contained an "unmistakable visual style, using quiet, contemplative shots, often coupled with long monologues or dialogues" and that the film featured imagery that would be seen in Oshii's later films such as water and tanks. Vincent Ostria stated in Les Inrockuptibles that the film is "a series of dreams in abyss, foretelling...the virtual games of Avalon and Ghost in the Shell". Todd French of Cinefantastique called the film a "must-see", comparing the work to Alain Resnais' "existentialist time-space displacement flicks" and the Agatha Christie novel And Then There Were None. Meanwhile, John Hartl of The Seattle Times compared the film's use of a time loop to the later 1993 film Groundhog Day. Aaron Gerow of The Daily Yomiuri referred to Beautiful Dreamer as a critique to "both the repetitive world of anime and the otaku fans who lock themselves up in that universe." Jeff Yang of SFGate compared the film to Oshii's next film, Angel's Egg, claiming that both of the films question "whether what we think is 'real' is real and whether we're really 'thinking' at all -- or whether we're just the products of someone else's fantasy."

On mania.com Chris Beveridge called the film "a great anime classic". On Japanator, Hiroko Yamamura said the film "was a game changer in the world of anime feature films". In Otaku USA, Daryl Surat said the film "is commonly hailed as one of the single best anime films of all time". Mason Proulx gave the film 5 stars, stating that "like all Urusei Yatsura, this movie is bizarre and silly, but it somehow manages to give its audience food for the mind and the soul." THEM Anime Reviews gave the film 4 stars and called it "a skilled surrealist Oshii Mamoru piece with lots of mystery and just enough Urusei Yatsura wackiness to remain familiar." Olivier Bitoun on TVClassik gave the film 3 stars. Fred Patten of Animation World Network stated that the film was an excellent movie, but also stated that it was not a good representative sample of the series. In "The Anime Movie Guide", Helen McCarthy gave the film three stars out of five, writing "Oshii uses the story [of Urashima Tarō] as a basis of a comedy that plays with serious issues like time, space, reality and perception.

Accolades
Kinema Junpo ranked Beautiful Dreamer as the 17th best Japanese film of 1984. That same publication later ranked it as one of the best Japanese animated movies. The film was the runner-up for the "Best 10" films in the 6th Yokohama Film Festival. In the 1984 edition of the Anime Grand Prix, the film was ranked third place. The film was ranked number 38 on a list of the Top 100 anime by Animage magazine. It was also number 9 on a list by Wizard's Anime Magazine of the Top 50 anime released in North America. In February 2004, Cinefantastique listed the film as one of the "10 Essential Animations" of Japan. In 2017, Paste listed the film as number 28 on their "Top 100 Best Anime Movies of All Time" list.

Legacy
Vincent Ostria stated in Les Inrockuptibles that the film is "a series of dreams in abyss, foretelling...the virtual games of Avalon and Ghost in the Shell". John Hartl of The Seattle Times compared the film's use of a time loop plot device to the later 1993 film Groundhog Day. The scholar Benedict Marko compared it to the 1998 film Dark City, which he believes to have been influenced by Urusei Yatsura 2. Josh Zyber of Hi-Def Digest said it "was a clear influence on both Groundhog Day and Dark City". The writers Brian Camp and Davis Julie have also compared it to Groundhog Day. Steve Heisler of The A.V. Club compared it to the 2011 film Inception.

Manga UK traces the roots of time loop anime and manga to Beautiful Dreamer. The time loop device has since appeared in numerous Japanese anime, manga, and light novels, such as the 1987 anime series Kimagure Orange Road in the Christmas episode ("Kyosuke Timetrips! The Third Christmas"), the "Endless Eight" arc of the Haruhi Suzumiya light novels (2004) and anime series (2009), and the light novel All You Need is Kill (2004) which was adapted into the Hollywood film Edge of Tomorrow (2014).

Notes

References

Footnotes

Sources

External links

1980s fantasy comedy films
1984 anime films
1984 comedy films
1984 films
Animated comedy films
Anime films based on manga
Central Park Media
Comedy anime and manga
Discotek Media
Films about dreams
Films based on works by Rumiko Takahashi
Films directed by Mamoru Oshii
Japanese animated fantasy films
Japanese fantasy comedy films
Japanese sequel films
Time loop anime and manga
Time loop films
Toho animated films
Urusei Yatsura